is a Japanese nude model, gravure idol, tarento and actress. Shimamura applied to the Guinness Book of Records for recognition of her twenty photobooks.

Partial filmography

 Natural Woman (1994) - Saki
 Ike! Inachū takkyū-bu (TV series) - Rie Hōjō
 XX: Beautiful Beast (1995) - Ran/Black Orchid
 監禁列島　美しき女豹 (1995) (video) - Sen
 リップステック　堕ちていく女 (1996) (video)
 Moon Angel (爆走！　ムーンエンジェル　－北へ 　1996) - Nema Natsuko
 Legend of the Devil (1996) - Kazunoshin Asahina
 Rose: Predator Leopardess (Rose 殺戮の女豹 1996) (video)
 仁義８　内部抗争激化 (1996) (video)
 Sexy Cop 348 新・女刑事サシバ (1996) (video)
 修羅之介斬魔剣　妖魔伝説 　キングレコード＝東北新社 (1996)
 ＸＸ　しなやかな美獣 (1997) (video)
 Kill (1997) (video)
 極道三国志 (1997) Knack
 W・Heat (1998) (video)
 監禁遊戯　ダブルフェイク (1998) (video)
 Junk: Shiryō-gari (2000)
 裏切りの晩歌 (2002)
 Gun Crazy 2: Beyond the Law (2002)

References

External links
 "嶋村かおり しまむら・かおり" at allcinema.net
 
 
 "嶋村かおり( 出演 )" at Kinema Junpo.
 "嶋村かおり" at tvdrama-db.com
 Kaori Shimamura   嶋村かおり at urabon-navigator.com
 "嶋村かおり(シマムラカオリ)の映画作品" at movie.walkerplus.com

1971 births
Living people
Japanese actresses
Actors from Yamaguchi Prefecture
Japanese bloggers
Japanese gravure idols
Japanese female adult models
Japanese women bloggers
Models from Yamaguchi Prefecture